Sean Covel is an American  film producer best known for being a producer of Napoleon Dynamite.

Early life
Covel grew up in Edgemont, South Dakotaand attended college at the University of Nebraska, Kearney, majoring in Broadcast Management with a minor in acting. Covel then took a position as a headhunter in San Francisco, and eventually opened his own firm before ultimately turning his attention back to film making. Covel received a Master of Fine Arts from the University of Southern California School of Cinematic Arts, Peter Stark Producing Program where he occasionally lectures.

Career
After college, Covel began work on the film Think Tank. In 2003 he joined the team writing and producing Napoleon Dynamite, which won critical acclaim. For his and Chris Wyatt's work on the film, they were nominated for the producer award at the 20th Independent Spirit Awards.

Covel's other producing credits include 12 Dogs of Christmas, Beneath, Carter & June  and Cafe.

In 2019, Covel gave a TED talk entitled “The mind is a computer. The question is how,” on the mental framework of problem-solving.

Philanthropy

In 2015, he founded a children's charity, 12 Days of Pizza, which works annually with Pizza Ranch to help low-income elementary school children eat over school holiday periods. It started with 144 meals being provided to 12 families. Within a three-year period, the program grew to provide over 12,000 meals to over 1000 food-insecure families with elementary school aged children. The program continues to expand each year. The program is also available for people affected due to coronavirus.

In 2019, Covel partnered with illustrator Rebecca Swift to launch a 64-book series for kids, in which the title character is called Porter the Hoarder. The first book, Porter the Hoarder and the Ransacked Room, was a bestseller in 2019.

The Porter the Hoarder series is now part of a charitable program with The United Way called Black Hills Reads. The partnership saw over 2000 books given to elementary school children in the Black Hills area in January 2019.

Following the success of this initiative, the S.D. Statewide Family Engagement Center (SDSFEC) became involved with the series, using the books as a vehicle for promoting more active engagement from children and their parents in literature and literacy. As part of the partnership, over 10,000 more students received books. The partnership will run for four more years.

Personal life
Covel was married to actress Alexa Vega from 2010 to 2012.

Filmography 

 Napoleon Dynamite (2004) - Producer
 The 12 Dogs of Christmas (2005) - Producer
 Think Tank (2006) - Producer
 Beneath (2007) - Producer
 Broken Hill (2009) - Executive Producer 
 Cafe (2011) - Producer
 Napoleon Dynamite (TV Series -2012) - Producer
 Concrete Blondes (2013) - Producer
 Driving Blind (Documentary - 2014) - Executive Producer
 Carter & June (2017) - Producer
 Tater Tot & Patton (2017) - Executive Producer

References

External links
 

Living people
American film producers
USC School of Cinematic Arts alumni
University of Nebraska at Kearney alumni
Place of birth missing (living people)
People from Newcastle, Wyoming
People from Fall River County, South Dakota
People from Lead, South Dakota
Year of birth missing (living people)